Raipur Rani is a census town in Panchkula district in the Indian state of Haryana. Narayangarh in the Ambala District is the next large town in its proximity.

History 
Raipur Rani was founded in 1420 by Rao Rai Singh who claimed to be one of the sons of Rana Har Rai singh who came from Ajmer, and was ruled till Indian Independence by his descendants who were titled Rao Sahib.

Fort of Raipur Rani 

Raipur Rani has a fort built by a man who came from Ajmer and was ruled till Indian Independence. The descendants of the ruling family now reside in Chandigarh

Demographics 
 Indian census, Raipur Rani had a population of 7027. Males constitute 54% of the population and females 46%. Raipur Rani has an average literacy rate of 69%, higher than the national average of 59.5%: male literacy is 74%, and female literacy is 63%. In Raipur Rani, 15% of the population is under six years of age.
It is also known for its mythological and historical importance. It is believed that The tenth Sikh Guru, Guru Gobind Singh had visited the Queen of Raipur and hence named the place after the queen.

It is a place which has bounty of nature in its realms.

Sharda Mata (Maa Sarasvati Devi) Temple Chotta Trilokpur 

Sharda Mata Temple Chotta Trilokpur, also known as Maa Sarasvati Devi Temple Chotta Trilokpur, is the sacred and holy Temple Complex of Sharda Mata is located in the village of Chhota Trilokpur,  from Raipur Rani on the border of Haryana and Himachal Pradesh. This Temple belongs to Maa Saraswati, the goddess of knowledge and learning. Many oral traditions are prevalent about the history of this holy temple of Shri Sharda Mata. This village formed part of the old Nahan state.

As part of INR1200 crore plan announced in January 2019, Government of Haryana is developing this temple, along with  Kalesar Mahadev temple, Kapal Mochan Tirth, Panchmukhi Hanuman temple of Basatiyawala and Lohgarh fort capital of Banda Singh Bahadur.

Education 
Raipur Rani is growing up as Education Hub. One Government College (co-educational) started in session 2018–19, located near bus stand. There are so many high & senior secondary schools in Raipur Rani, providing both English and Hindi education. Among these are the Government Senior Secondary School (co-educational). There are two industrial training institutes.

There are also many computer training centers which are providing IT education with latest technologies named as Guideline Computer Centre and many others.

See also 
 Haryana Tourism
 List of Monuments of National Importance in Haryana
 List of State Protected Monuments in Haryana
 List of Indus Valley Civilization sites in Haryana
 List of National Parks & Wildlife Sanctuaries of Haryana, India
 List of national parks of India
 Wildlife sanctuaries of India

References

External links 
 http://www.raipurrani.com/
 http://shardamata.com/

Cities and towns in Panchkula district